This is a list of notable Bangladeshi Film Directors.

Film Directors

A
 Abdullah al Mamun
 Abdul Jabbar Khan
 Abdus Samad
 Abu Shahed Emon
 Abu Sayeed (film director)
 A J Mintu
 Akhtaruzzaman
 Alamgir Kabir
 Alamgir
 Amjad Hossain
 Ananta Jalil
 Animesh Aich
 Anonno Mamun
 Ashiqur Rahman
 Ashraf Shishir
 Azizur Rahman
 ATM Shamsuzzaman

B
 Baby Islam
 Badol Khondokar
 Badal Rahman
 Badiul Alam Khokon

C
 Chashi Nazrul Islam

D
 Delwar Jahan Jhantu
 Dilip Biswas
 Dipankar Dipon
 Dewan Nazrul

E
 Ehtesham
 Enamul Karim Nirjhar

G
 Gazi Mazharul Anwar
 Gazi Rakayet
 Giasuddin Selim

H
 Humayun Ahmed
 Hasibul Islam Mizan
 Hashibur Reza Kallol

I
 Idrish Haider
 Iftakar Chowdhury
 Ispahani Arif Jahan

K
 Khan Ataur Rahman
 Khalid Mahmood Mithu
 Kazi Hayat
 Kazi Morshed

M
 Malek Afsary
 Masud Pathik
 Matin Rahman
 Meher Afroz Shaon
 Mohammad Mostafa Kamal Raz
 Montazur Rahman Akbar
 Morshedul Islam
 Menhaj Huda
 Mostofa Sarwar Farooki
 Murad Parvez
 Mustafizur Rahman Manik

N
 Nargis Akhter
 Narayan Ghosh Mita
 Naeem Mohaiemen
 Nasiruddin Yousuff
 Nurul Alam Atique

O
 Obaidul Huq

R
 Raihan Rafi
 Reza Latif
 Redoan Rony
 Rozina
 Ruhul Amin

S
 SA Haque Alik
 Salahuddin
 Samia Zaman
 Shafi Uddin Shafi
 Shahadat Hossain Liton
 Shahidul Islam Khokon
 Shahriar Nazim Joy
 Sheikh Niamat Ali
 Shamim Ahamed Roni
 Shibli Sadik
 Shihab Shaheen
 Sohanur Rahman Sohan
 Sohel Rana
 Subhash Dutta
 Sudhendu Roy
 Syed Wahiduzzaman Diamond

T
 Tanvir Mokammel
 Tareque Masud
 Tauquir Ahmed

U
 Uzzal

Z
 Zahidur Rahman Anjan
 Zakir Hossain Raju

Bangladesh